Wymer, West Virginia may refer to:
Wymer, Lewis County, West Virginia, an unincorporated community in Lewis County
Wymer, Randolph County, West Virginia, an unincorporated community in Randolph County